Events from the year 1283 in Ireland.

Incumbent
Lord: Edward I

Events
 Walter de Fulburn became Lord Chancellor of Ireland

Births

Deaths

References

 
1280s in Ireland
Ireland
Years of the 13th century in Ireland